Marica Branchesi (Urbino, March 7, 1977) is an Italian astrophysicist. Her leadership and scientific work was pivotal for Virgo/LIGO's discovery of gravitational waves. She is vice president of  International Astronomical Union Gravitational Wave Astrophysics Commission  and  member of the Gravitational Wave International Committee.

Education 
Branchesi completed her undergraduate degree in astronomy in 2002, and obtained a Ph.D. from the University of Bologna in 2006, with a focus in radio astronomy, black holes and clusters of galaxies. She then moved to the California Institute of Technology, where she met her husband, Jan Harms, German physicist and gravitational waves expert.

Research 
After being awarded a grant by Italian Minister of Education in 2009, she decided to move back to Italy, where she built her own research staff at the University of Urbino. She is now an assistant professor at the Gran Sasso Science Institute, where she works as co-liaison to coordinate between LIGO's and Virgo's follow up of sending gravitational-wave alerts in low-latency. At LIGO/Virgo, she also studied gravitational waves physics and electromagnetic signals associated with gravitational signal sources.

Notably, she was named one of Nature's "Ten people who mattered this year" for her work as liaison between LIGO and Virgo in the gravitational wave collaboration. She served as a link between the physicists and astronomers, and encouraged both groups to take tentative detections more seriously and coordinated telescopes to follow up on events as soon as they were discovered.

Her current interests lie in understanding the nature of black holes and neutron stars, namely what governs their emission, formation and evolution. With her research, she aims to develop multi-messenger astronomy that uses electromagnetic and gravitational waves to probe the most energetic phenomena in the universe.

Awards 
 2016 - Breakthrough Prize to Ligo/Virgo project for detection of gravitational waves 100 years after Albert Einstein predicted their existence.
 2017 - “Ten people who mattered this year” of Nature.
 2018 - "TIME 100 most influential people"

Works

See also 
 Women in science
 Multi-messenger astronomy

References

External links 
 Marica Branchesi at Gran Sasso Science Institute
 Marica Branchesi at International Astronomical Union

Italian astrophysicists
1977 births
Living people
People from Urbino
Italian women scientists